Poecilimon thoracicus is a species of bush cricket.

The species is nocturnal.

References

Phaneropterinae